Examba is a City and Municipal Council in the Belgaum district of the Indian state of karnataka.

Before becoming the Town Panchayath Council (TPC) in 2015, it was Gram Panchayath since from 1956.

Summary
 Population –	           23,000
 Area –	           38.76 km2
 Number of Properties –	   3900
 Number of Wards –	   17
 Length of Roads –	   113.23 km
 Total Water Supply –	   5 lakhs ltrs
 Per Capita Water Supply – 95 L.P.C.D.
 Summer Temperature –	   35–40 *C
 Winter Temperature –	   20–25 *C

Demographics
Examba village has a population of 15,224 of which 7,810 are males while 7,414 are females as per Population Census 2011. There are 3,253 families residing.

In Examba village population of children with age 0–6 is 1,654 which makes up 10.86% of total population of village. Average Sex Ratio of Examba village is 949 which is lower than Karnataka state average of 973. Child Sex Ratio for the Examba as per census is 854, lower than Karnataka average of 948.

Examba village has higher literacy rate when compared with Karnataka. In 2011, literacy rate of Examba village was 80.40% compared with 75.36% of Karnataka. In Examba Male literacy stands at 89.39% while female literacy rate was 71.05%.

As per constitution of India and Panchyati Raaj Act, Examba village is administrated by Sarpanch (Head of Village) who is elected representative of village.

As Examba is located very close to the Maharashtra border, people in this village are bilingual and can speak both Kannada and Marathi. Most of the population are into farming and depend mainly on farming to make their living. 
Beereshwar Society, which is a multi state co-operative bank is headquartered here.

Temples
The village has several temples:
 Neminath Tirthankar Basadi (11th Century)
 Village God Shree Beereshwar Temple
 Shree Karlhondibeereshwar Temple
 Shree Mahadev Temple
 Shree Santubai Temple
 Shree Ykanathi Temple
 Shree Hanuman Temple
 Shree Mahalaxshmi Temple
 Shree Pandurang Temple
 Shree Renuka Yellamma Temple
 Hazarat Shahnandwali Dargah
 Hazarat Mansurwali Dargah
 Hazarat Davalshawali (Malangbaba) Dargah
 Sitaram Temple
 Maragubayi temple
 kumbhar lagamavva
 ganesh mandir
 Thaloba Temple
 Karevva Temple
 Datta Temple

See also
 Belagavi
 Districts of Karnataka

References

Villages in Belagavi district